Daniel Wise (born January 16, 1996) is an American football defensive tackle for the Kansas City Chiefs of the National Football League (NFL). He played college football at Kansas and signed with the Dallas Cowboys as an undrafted free agent in 2019.

Early years
Wise attended Hebron High School, where he was a starter at defensive tackle. As a junior, he tallied 77 tackles, one forced fumble and one fumble recovery. As a senior, he posted 49 tackles (33 solo), 5 sacks and 14 quarterback hurries.

College career
Wise accepted a football scholarship from the University of Kansas. As a freshman, he appeared in 12 games (7 starts), while making 26 tackles (5.5 for loss), 3.5 sacks, one pass breakup and one blocked kick.

As a sophomore, he started 11 games at defensive tackle, totalling 38 tackles, 3 sacks, one pass breakup and 2 blocked kicks. He had 8 tackles and 4 tackles for loss against Ohio University.

As a junior, he started at 12 games, registering 53 tackles, 7 sacks (led the team), 16 tackles for loss (led the team), 5 quarterback hurries, one pass breakup and one fumble recovery. He had 5 tackles and 4 tackles for loss against Southeast Missouri State University.

As a senior, he started 11 games, recording 34 tackles, 5 sacks and 12.5 tackles for loss. He had 8 tackles (one for loss) against Nicholls State University. He made 5 tackles and 2 sacks against West Virginia University. He had 5 tackles (3 for loss) and one sack against the University of Texas.

Professional career

Dallas Cowboys
Wise was signed by the Dallas Cowboys as an undrafted free agent after the 2019 NFL Draft on April 30. He was waived on August 31, 2019, and was signed to the practice squad. On December 30, 2019, Wise was signed to a reserve/future contract. He was waived on March 18, 2020.

Arizona Cardinals
On October 28, 2020, Wise was signed to the Arizona Cardinals practice squad. He was released six days later.

Washington Football Team / Commanders

On January 12, 2021, Wise signed a reserve/futures contract with the Washington Football Team. He was released on August 31, 2021, but re-signed to the practice squad the following day. He was elevated to the active roster for the team's Week 3 game against the Buffalo Bills, and reverted back to the practice squad following the game. Washington signed Wise to their active roster on November 16, 2021. He suffered a knee injury in Week 15 and was placed on injured reserve on December 24.

Wise re-signed with the team on March 17, 2022. He played in 11 games before being waived on December 31, 2022.

Kansas City Chiefs
On January 4, 2023, Wise was signed to the Kansas City Chiefs practice squad. He was released on January 17. He was signed again on February 3, to a reserve/future contract.

Personal life
Wise is the son of former Canadian Football League and Arena Football League player Deatrich Wise and the brother of Deatrich Wise Jr.

References

External links
 Washington Commanders bio
 Kansas Jayhawks bio

1996 births
Living people
American football defensive tackles
American football defensive ends
Arizona Cardinals players
Dallas Cowboys players
Kansas Jayhawks football players
People from Lewisville, Texas
Sportspeople from the Dallas–Fort Worth metroplex
Players of American football from Texas
Washington Football Team players
Washington Commanders players
Kansas City Chiefs players